Diphosphoinositol polyphosphate phosphohydrolase 3-beta is an enzyme that in humans is encoded by the NUDT11 gene.

NUDT11 belongs to a subgroup of phosphohydrolases that preferentially attack diphosphoinositol polyphosphates (Hidaka et al., 2002).[supplied by OMIM]

References

Further reading

Nudix hydrolases